Mount Ngun Ngun (said as Ngun Ngun) is the sixth tallest of the Glass House Mountains at 253 m. It has a well maintained walking trail to the summit that affords good views. The trail from carpark (with tap) is not as steep as the higher mountains and is open to beginners. The south face contains steeper, unmarked but well known rock climbing routes. When viewed from Moreton Bay it lines up with and is silhouetted by Mount Beerwah and Mt Coonowrin/Crookneck. This was noted by Captain Cook on his first voyage of along the East coast of Australia. It is known as the dingo to the family of the rest of the Glasshouse Mountains.

Ngun Ngun is arguably the best place to view the taller mountains that QNPRSR has restricted access to.

See also

List of mountains of Australia

References

Glass House Mountains (Queensland)
Glass House Mountains, Queensland